Commotria is a genus of snout moths. It was described by Carlos Berg in 1885.

Species
 Commotria albinervella Hampson, 1918
 Commotria albistria Janse, 1922
 Commotria castaneipars Hampson, 1918
 Commotria enervella Hampson, 1918
 Commotria invenustella Berg, 1885
 Commotria leucosparsalis Janse, 1922
 Commotria mesiella Hampson, 1918
 Commotria phlebicella Hampson, 1918
 Commotria phoenicias Hampson, 1918
 Commotria phyrdes (Dyar, 1914)
 Commotria prohaeella Hampson, 1918
 Commotria rhodoneura Hampson, 1918
 Commotria rosella Hampson, 1918
 Commotria ruficolor Janse, 1922
 Commotria rufidelineata Hampson, 1918
 Commotria tripartella Hampson, 1918
 Commotria venosella Hampson, 1918

References

Anerastiini
Pyralidae genera